Dioxolane is a heterocyclic acetal with the chemical formula (CH2)2O2CH2. It is related to tetrahydrofuran by interchange of one oxygen for a CH2 group. The corresponding saturated 6-membered C4O2 rings are called dioxanes. The isomeric 1,2-dioxolane (wherein the two oxygen centers are adjacent) is a peroxide. 1,3-dioxolane is used as a solvent and as a comonomer in polyacetals.

As a class of compounds
Dioxolanes are a group of organic compounds containing the dioxolane ring.  Dioxolanes can be prepared by acetalization of aldehydes and ketalization of ketones with ethylene glycol.

Protecting groups
Organic compounds containing carbonyl groups sometimes need protection so that they do not undergo reactions during transformations of other functional groups that may be present.  A variety of approaches to protection and deprotection of carbonyls including as dioxolanes are known.  For example, consider the compound methyl cyclohexanone-4-carboxylate, where lithium aluminium hydride reduction will produce 4-hydroxymethylcyclohexanol.  The ester functional group can be reduced without affecting the ketone by protecting the ketone as a ketal.  The ketal is produced by acid catalysed reaction with ethylene glycol, the reduction reaction carried out, and the protecting group removed by hydrolysis to produce 4-hydroxymethylcyclohexanone.

NaBArF4 can also be used for deprotection of acetal or ketal-protected carbonyl compounds.  For example, deprotection of 2-phenyl-1,3-dioxolane to benzaldehyde can be achieved in water in five minutes at 30 °C.

PhCH(OCH2)2   +   H2O   ->[\ce{NaBAr4}][\text{30 °C / 5 min}] PhCHO + HOCH2CH2OH

Natural products
Neosporol is a natural product that includes a 1,3-dioxolane moiety, and is an isomer of sporol which has a 1,3-dioxane ring.  The total synthesis of both compounds has been reported, and each includes a step in which a dioxolane system is formed using trifluoroperacetic acid (TFPAA), prepared by the hydrogen peroxide – urea method. This method involves no water, so it gives a completely anhydrous peracid, necessary in this case as the presence of water would lead to unwanted side reactions.

   +      →      +      +   

In the case of neosporol, a Prilezhaev reaction with trifluoroperacetic acid is used to convert a suitable allyl alcohol precursor to an epoxide, which then undergoes a ring-expansion reaction with a proximate carbonyl functional group to form the dioxolane ring.

A similar approach is used in the total synthesis of sporol, with the dioxolane ring later expanded to a dioxane system.

See also
 Dioxane

References

External links
 environmental and toxicological data

 
Muscarinic agonists
Solvents
Protecting groups
Formals